Francis Peter Plowden (8 June 1749 – 4 January 1829) was an English Jesuit, barrister and writer.

Life

Francis Plowden, born in Shropshire on 8 June 1749, was the eighth son of William Ignatius Plowden of Plowden Hall. He was educated at St. Omer's College and entered the Jesuit novitiate at Watten in 1766.

When the Society was suppressed, he was teaching at the College at Bruges. Not being in holy orders he was, by the terms of suppression, relieved of his first vows, and soon afterwards married Dorothea, daughter of George J. Griffith Phillips, esq., of Curaegwillinag, Carmarthenshire. "Curaegwillinag" is an anglicisation of the Welsh placename for an old commote located in Carmarthenshire. Kymwt Carnywyllawn was in Cantref Eginawc (anglicized as "Eginog"), which was in Ystrad Tywi.

He entered the Middle Temple and practiced as a conveyancer, the only department of the legal profession open to Catholics under the Penal Laws. After the relief Act of 1791 he was called to the Bar. His first major work, Jura Anglorum, appeared in 1792, a conservative formulation of natural rights and contract theory. It was attacked in a pamphlet by his brother Robert Plowden, a priest under the title of "A Roman Catholic Clergyman". The book was so highly thought of that the University of Oxford presented him with the honorary degree of D.C.L., a unique distinction for a Catholic of those days.

His improvidence, extreme views, and intractable disposition made his life a troubled one. Having fallen out with the Lord Chancellor, he ceased to practice at the bar and devoted himself to writing. While in Dublin (1811) he published his work "Ireland since the Union" which led to a prosecution on the part of the Government for libel, resulting in a verdict of £5000 damages. Plowden considered that this was rewarded by a packed jury and determined not to pay it. He escaped to Paris where he spent the remaining years of his life in comparative poverty as a professor at the Scots College, dying on 4 January 1829, aged 79.

Family
The comic play, Virginia, by his wife Dorothea was condemned following its premier performance.

Their eldest daughter, Anna Maria, became the third countess of Archibald, ninth earl of Dundonald.

Works
Plowden's Historical Review of the State of Ireland (1803) was written at the request of the Government, but it was too outspoken a condemnation to meet their views, and was attacked by Richard Musgrave in the Historical Review and also by the British Critic. Plowden answered by a Posthumous Preface giving an account of his communications with Henry Addington, 1st Viscount Sidmouth, and also by a Historical Letter to Sir Richard Musgrave.

His Historical Letters to Sir John Coxe Hippisley (1815) contained matter connected with the question of Catholic emancipation. His other works are:

The Case Stated (Cath. Relief Act, 1791).
Church and State (London, 1794).
Treatise on the Law of Usury (London, 1796).
The Constitution of the United Kingdom (London, 1802).
Historical Letters to Rev. C. O'Connor (Dublin, 1812).
Human Subordination (Paris, 1824).

References

Attribution
 The entry cites:
, s. v.
Joseph Gillow, Bibl. Dict. Eng. Cath. s. v. 
John Kirk, Biographies of English Catholics
Henry Foley, Records Eng. Prov. S. J., IV, VII (London, 1878–80), giving pedigree of Plowden; 
Bernard Ward, The Dawn of the Catholic Revival in England 1781-1803 (London, 1909)
Gentleman's Magazine (1829)

External links
In A Compendium of Irish Biography

1749 births
1829 deaths
18th-century English writers
18th-century English male writers
19th-century English writers
English barristers
18th-century English Jesuits
19th-century English Jesuits